The Greatest Hits is the first compilation album by country singer Clint Black. It compiles 12 hit songs from his first five albums. It also includes four new recordings: the singles "Like the Rain" and "Half Way Up", as well as "Cadillac Jack Favor" and a live cover of the Eagles' "Desperado". Black had originally covered this song in 1993 for the album, Common Thread: The Songs of the Eagles.

The compilation was a commercial and critical success, currently certified at double platinum by the RIAA.

Track listing

Personnel

Eddie Bayers - drums
Clint Black - 12-string guitar, acoustic guitar, electric guitar, harmonica, lead vocals, background vocals
Michael Black - background vocals
Dane Bryant - piano, background vocals
Larry Byrom - acoustic guitar
Lenny Castro - percussion
Larry Corbett - cello
Eric Darken - percussion
Brian Dembov - viola
Steve Dorff - string arrangements
Bonnie Douglas - violin
Jerry Douglas - dobro
Stuart Duncan - fiddle
Thom Flora- background vocals
Paul Franklin - steel guitar
Tommy Funderbunk - background vocals
Berj Garabedian - violin
Sonny Garrish -steel guitar
Dick Gay - drums, percussion
James Getzoff - violin
Ed Greene - drums
Rob Hajacos - fiddle
Lisa Hartman-Black - background vocals
Aubrey Haynie - fiddle
John Hobbs - piano
Dann Huff - electric guitar
Mitch Humphries - piano
Jeff Huskins - fiddle, keyboards
Wynonna Judd - vocals on "A Bad Goodbye"
Dennis Karmazyn - cello
Shane Keister - keyboards, piano
Jan Kelley - cello
Jana King - background vocals
Ezra Kliger - violin
Brian Leonard - violin
Kenny Loggins - background vocals
Joy Lyle - violin
Liana Manis - background vocals
Randy McCormick - keyboards
Craig Morris - background vocals
Buell Neidlinger - upright bass
Maria Newman - violin
Hayden Nicholas - acoustic guitar, electric guitar, sitar, background vocals
Mark O'Connor - fiddle
John Permenter - fiddle
Jeff Peterson - dobro, steel guitar
Jim Photogolo - background vocals
Barbara Porter - violin
Don Potter - acoustic guitar
Steve Real - background vocals
Michael Rhodes - bass guitar
Matt Rollings - keyboards, piano
Brent Rowan - electric guitar
John Wesley Ryles - background vocals
Timothy B. Schmit - background vocals
Harry Shirinian - viola
Harry Schultz - cello
Paul Shure - violin
Leland Sklar - bass guitar
Spiro Stamos - violin
Harry Stinson - background vocals
James Stroud - percussion
Ray Tisher - viola
Wendy Waldman - background vocals
Biff Watson - acoustic guitar
Jake Willemain - bass guitar
Dennis Wilson - background vocals
John Wittenberg - violin
Glenn Worf - bass guitar
Curtis Young - background vocals
Martin Young - acoustic guitar
Reggie Young - electric guitar
Tibor Zelig - violin
Mihail Zinovyev - viola

Charts

Weekly charts

Year-end charts

Singles

References

Greatest Hits [CD liner notes]. 1996. RCA Records.
[ Artist Chart History (Singles)]. Billboard. Retrieved on January 1, 2007.
[ Artist Chart History (Albums)]. Billboard. Retrieved on January 1, 2007.

1996 compilation albums
Clint Black compilation albums
RCA Records compilation albums
Albums produced by James Stroud